Australia's exclusive economic zone (EEZ) was declared on 1 August 1994 and extends from  from the coastline of Australia and its external territories, except where a maritime delimitation agreement exists with another state. To the 12 nautical-mile boundary is Australia's territorial waters.

The United Nations Commission on the Limits of the Continental Shelf (CLCS) confirmed, in April 2008, Australia's rights over an additional  of seabed beyond the limits of Australia's EEZ. Australia also claimed, in its submission to the UN Commission on the Limits of the Continental Shelf, additional Continental Shelf past its EEZ from the Australian Antarctic Territory, but these claims were deferred on Australia's request.

Maritime boundary
North and east of Australia is an extensive maritime boundary with Indonesia, Papua New Guinea, East Timor, New Caledonia (France), Solomon Islands, and New Zealand.

It starts in the Indian Ocean, then runs through the Timor Sea, Arafura Sea, Torres Strait, Coral Sea and ends in the Pacific Ocean.

There is also a maritime border between Australia and Indonesia in the Indian Ocean between Australia's external territory of Christmas Island and the Indonesian island of Java.

Geography

See also
 Australia–Indonesia border
 Australian marine parks
 Australian Whale Sanctuary
 Geography of Australia
 Timor Sea Treaty

Notes

References

External links 
 Continental Shelf Submission of Australia

Exclusive economic zone of Australia
Australia
Borders of Australia
Economy of Australia
Australia–France relations
Australia–Indonesia relations
Australia–New Zealand relations